Allohercostomus is a genus of flies in the family Dolichopodidae. The generic name is a combination of the Greek prefix allo- with the generic name Hercostomus.

Species 
 Allohercostomus chinensis Yang, Saigusa & Masunaga, 2001
 Allohercostomus nepalensis Yang, Saigusa & Masunaga, 2001
 Allohercostomus rotundatus (Yang & Saigusa, 1999)

References 

Dolichopodidae genera
Dolichopodinae
Diptera of Asia